Big Brook flows into North Branch Little Black Creek by Wheelertown, New York.

References 

Rivers of New York (state)
Rivers of Herkimer County, New York